Major League Baseball (MLB) franchises have been proposed in Portland, Oregon on two occasions. The Oregon Stadium Campaign and the City of Portland were involved in creating a presentation for a committee in charge of relocating the Montreal Expos in 2003. The proposal included possible sites for new baseball parks. In the midst of the campaign for the Expos, the Oregon State Legislature passed a bill that secured US$150 million in funds for a new stadium, that can still be used. The proposal was passed up and Washington, D.C. was selected as the new home of the Expos. In 2007, the Florida Marlins considered re-locating to Portland. On both occasions, PGE Park, the minor league baseball park at the time, would have been used until a new stadium could be completed. Currently, the Portland metropolitan area is the largest metro area in the United States that houses another major league sports franchise (the Portland Timbers and the Portland Trail Blazers) without having an MLB franchise.

Proposed teams

Montreal Expos relocation (2002–2003)
After MLB made it official the Montreal Expos were going to be relocated, Portland was named as a potential candidate. Then-Portland Mayor Vera Katz and other officials went to New York City to address the committee that was in charge of the Expos relocation. In 2003, the Oregon State Legislature passed Senate Bill 5, which provided US$150 million towards a new stadium. If the Expos did move to Portland, under the proposal set forth by the then-mayor would use PGE Park as the team's temporary stadium. The Expos were eventually awarded to Washington, D.C. and now play as the Washington Nationals.

Florida Marlins possible relocation (2006–2007)
In 2006, there was question of whether or not the Florida Marlins would be able to secure the funds for a new stadium. This opened a proposal for the Marlins to be relocated to Portland. Former professional baseball player Johnny Pesky, who is a Portland native, expressed his desire to see an MLB franchise in his home town stating, "Why shouldn't Portland have a club? I think they should get a shot. I think Portland will have a team in three or four years." The proposed plan would use the funds secured from Senate Bill 5 to build a new stadium. While it was being built, the team would play in PGE Park, which would be expanded into a 25,000 seat facility as a quick fix. On January 6, 2006, Marlins officials visited Portland as a possible re-location site. The officials included team president David Samson, vice chairman Joel Mael and Claude Delorme. Six other cities were possible re-locations sites along with Portland.

Portland Diamond Project (2017–)

In 2017, MLB commissioner Rob Manfred announced that an ownership group led by retired Nike vice president Craig Cheek and former Portland Trail Blazers broadcaster Mike Barrett are working to secure financing for a stadium and bring Major League Baseball to Portland. On April 17, 2018, the potential ownership group, Portland Diamond Project, submitted formal proposals to purchase one of two potential stadium sites close to downtown Portland. One site was Portland Public Schools' headquarters, located north of the Moda Center, and the other location is an industrial site in Northwest Portland However, on November 7, 2018, the offer for the PPS site was formally retracted by the Portland Diamond Project.

On June 1, 2018 it was announced that former Seattle Seahawks quarterback and former Colorado Rockies farmhand Russell Wilson is investing in the Portland Diamond Project, along with his wife, singer, songwriter and entertainer Ciara. In 2019, former MLB player and Portland native Darwin Barney was also investing in the project.

Portland Diamond Ballpark
On November 29, 2018, the Portland Diamond Project announced that it had reached an agreement to build a baseball park on the 45-acre Terminal 2 of the Port of Portland in the Northwest Industrial neighborhood of the city. The park, designed by Populous in partnership with TVA Architects, will be located on the Willamette River. It will have a capacity of 32,000 to 34,000 and will include a retractable roof as well as a gondola lift suite. Construction is estimated to cost around $1 billion and efforts to get a Major League Baseball team to occupy it could cost the same.

Involved organizations
Three groups, the Oregon Sports Authority, the Portland Baseball Group and Oregon Baseball Campaign, came together for an organization known as the Oregon Stadium Campaign (OSC) to advance the hopes of location an MLB team in Portland.

Market
ESPN.com reported that the Portland metropolitan area was a bigger location than the ones that house the Cincinnati Reds, the Kansas City Royals and the Milwaukee Brewers. As of 2010, Portland was the largest market in the United States and the second largest in North America that houses a major league sports team (the Portland Timbers and the Portland Trail Blazers) without an MLB team. While the Oregon Sports Authority acknowledged in their official proposal that there may be bigger markets with more corporate support, they touted Portland's natural beauty, livability, metropolitan growth rate and television ratings as reason to award Portland with a team.

Public opinion
The Oregon Sports Authority cited a poll taken by Grove Insight in March 2003 in their official proposal that stated that over half of Oregon residents claimed that they would attend an MLB game each season. Furthermore, the poll also stated that 60 percent of Multnomah County residents would be "likely" to attend a game and 41 percent would be "very likely".

See also
History of baseball in Portland, Oregon

References

Proposed sports teams
Baseball in Portland, Oregon
Major League Baseball expansion